Orchard is a city in Mitchell County, Iowa, United States. The population was 68 at the time of the 2020 census.

History
Orchard got its start in the year 1869, following construction of the Illinois Central Railroad through that territory. It was named for Moses Orchard, a pioneer settler.

Lithograph City
The ghost town of Lithograph City, approximately two miles southwest of Orchard, was founded in the early 1900s adjacent to quarries that produced lithographic limestone. Production in these quarries peaked during World War I when access to German lithographic limestone was cut off. In 1915, Lithograph City had 15 houses, a hotel, a dance hall and a museum. After the war, use of stone blocks in lithography declined, the city was renamed Devonia, and by 1938, no trace of the town remained.

Geography
Orchard is located at  (43.226995, -92.774567).

Demographics

2010 census
At the 2010 census there were 71 people in 30 households, including 18 families, in the city. The racial makup of the city was 95.8% White, 1.4% African American, and 2.8% Native American.
Of the 30 households 26.7% had children under the age of 18 living with them, 46.7% were married couples living together, 13.3% had a female householder with no husband present, and 40.0% were non-families. 23.3% of households were one person and 6.7% were one person aged 65 or older. The average household size was 2.37 and the average family size was 2.94.

The median age was 42.2 years. 21.1% of residents were under the age of 18; 9.8% were between the ages of 18 and 24; 23.9% were from 25 to 44; 29.6% were from 45 to 64; and 15.5% were 65 or older. The gender makeup of the city was 50.7% male and 49.3% female.

2000 census
At the 2000 census there were 88 people in 33 households, including 23 families, in the city. The racial makup of the city was 100.00% White.
Of the 33 households 30.3% had children under the age of 18 living with them, 60.6% were married couples living together, 9.1% had a female householder with no husband present, and 27.3% were non-families. 21.2% of households were one person and 9.1% were one person aged 65 or older. The average household size was 2.67 and the average family size was 2.92.

The age distribution was 29.5% under the age of 18, 6.8% from 18 to 24, 28.4% from 25 to 44, 15.9% from 45 to 64, and 19.3% 65 or older. The median age was 36 years. For every 100 females, there were 100.0 males. For every 100 females age 18 and over, there were 106.7 males.

The median household income was $19,583 and the median family income  was $21,250. Males had a median income of $32,500 versus $22,083 for females. The per capita income for the city was $10,148. There were 22.2% of families and 25.3% of the population living below the poverty line, including 25.0% of under eighteens and 38.1% of those over 64.

Education
It is within the Osage Community School District.

References

Cities in Mitchell County, Iowa
Cities in Iowa